The 1973 National 500 was a NASCAR Winston Cup Series racing event that took place on October 7, 1973, at Charlotte Motor Speedway in Concord, North Carolina.

The Yom Kippur war between Israel and the Arabs broke out the day before. The Arab oil embargo soon went into effect and resulted in cancellation of the Texas race and shortening of 1974 races by 10%. Charlotte Motor Speedway was undergoing a leadership shakeup as original owner Bruton Smith was purchasing stock from holders looking to cash out; by 1973 he’d amassed nearly half the 1.4 million shares accounted for by the Speedway and despite public denials was seeking to usurp Richard Howard, the Speedway president appointed as such by bankruptcy court in 1963.

Qualifying 
The first driver to qualify for pole, Charlie Glotzbach, was found in a post qualifying inspection to have modified his restrictor plate in an illegal fashion. Glotsbach's team was fined $500 and the $1,000 pole bonus he was to receive was rescinded. Glotsbach was forced to re-qualify after changes were made to the car to make it legal, and qualified 34th. Pole was then awarded to David Pearson, who had qualified second.

Dean Dalton, whose performance on Saturday did not qualify him for the race, was allowed into the race 41st on the grid, because of the above.

Race report
334 laps took place on a paved track spanning  with two cautions given out for sixteen laps. However, the race took three hours and twenty-six minutes to finish with Cale Yarborough defeating Richard Petty by a time of 1.4 seconds. Yarborough and Petty would lap the field three times before retrieving the checkered flag. David Pearson won the official pole position with a speed of  - which was equivalent to 34.109 seconds. Sixty-four thousand people attended this live racing event. The race had a mobile home (driven by Tim Flock) to accompany the drivers and their vehicles on the opening parade lap; which was unusual back then by NASCAR standards and is still considered to be unusual in today's NASCAR.

Harry Gant would make his racing debut here; ultimately finishing in 11th place. Dick Trickle also made his debut here, finishing an impressive fifth. Wendell Scott would retire after this race; making a 12th-place finish in this event. Johnny Barnes' 15th-place run was his best in Cup competition. Wayne Andrews would pull out of the race on lap 5 due to engine problems.

Buddy Baker retired his car on lap 228, and team owner Nord Krauskopf refused to allow NASCAR to inspect the car after this was done. NASCAR disqualified the team, and therefore, Buddy Baker officially finished 41st. Baker was the last driver to be disqualified for technical infractions until 1992 (when Bobby Hillin Jr. was disqualified from the 1992 Mello Yello 500), after which NASCAR stopped disqualifying drivers until a 2019 rule change.

What made this race extra important to drivers was that $100 was given out for every lap that a driver led ($ when adjusted for inflation). Yarborough and Petty were said to have engines in their cars that exceeded the horsepower permitted by NASCAR during that era. Bobby Allison filed a complaint with Bill France, Jr. which resulted in a 6-hour meeting and "satisfactory restitution."

The race was held on a dry circuit; with no precipitation recorded around the speedway.

Qualifying

Finishing order
Section reference:

Timeline
Section reference:
 Start of race: David Pearson started the race with the pole position.
 Lap 5: Wayne Andrews' engine problem forced him out of the race.
 Lap 13: G.C. Spencer's engine problem forced him out of the race.
 Lap 32: Charlie Glotzbach took over the lead from Cale Yarborough.
 Lap 33: Lennie Pond took over the lead from Charlie Glotzbach.
 Lap 34: David Pearson took over the lead from Lennie Pond.
 Lap 46: Cale Yarborough took over the lead from David Pearson.
 Lap 47: Frank Warren's engine problem forced him out of the race.
 Lap 49: Dick Brooks' engine problem forced him out of the race.
 Lap 53: Dick Trickle took over the lead from Cale Yarbrough.
 Lap 55: Bobby Allison took over the lead from Dick Trickle.
 Lap 61: Donnie Allison's engine problem forced him out of the race.
 Lap 64: Neil Castles developed problems with his vehicle's suspension while Cale Yarborough took over the lead from Bobby Allison.
 Lap 223: Dave Marcis' engine problem forced him out of the race.
 Lap 228: Buddy Baker was disqualified by NASCAR due to non-compliance regarding engine inspection.
 Lap 230: Walter Ballard's engine problem forced him out of the race.
 Lap 233: Richard Petty took over the lead from Cale Yarborough.
 Lap 264: Joe Frasson's engine problem forced him out of the race.
 Lap 271: Cale Yarborough took over the lead from Richard Petty.
 Lap 281: Eddie Bond's engine problem forced him out of the race.
 Lap 282: Coo Coo Marlin's engine problem forced him out of the race.
 Lap 284: Richard Childress' engine problem forced him out of the race.
 Lap 299: Richard Petty took over the lead from Cale Yarborough.
 Lap 313: Cale Yarborough took over the lead from Richard Petty.
 Finish: Cale Yarborough was officially declared the winner of the event.

References

National 500
NASCAR races at Charlotte Motor Speedway
National 500